Denis Claude Cunningham (born 13 July 1950) is a Hong Kong fencer. He competed at the 1976 and 1984 Summer Olympics.

References

External links
 

1950 births
Living people
Hong Kong male épée fencers
Olympic fencers of Hong Kong
Fencers at the 1976 Summer Olympics
Fencers at the 1984 Summer Olympics
Fencers at the 1974 Asian Games
Fencers at the 1978 Asian Games
Asian Games competitors for Hong Kong
Hong Kong male foil fencers
20th-century Hong Kong people